Elijah Ari (born 6 November 1987), sometimes also known as Elijah Aryee, is a Ghanaian-Kyrgyz international footballer who plays as a defender, for Up Country Lions in the Sri Lanka Champions League. Born in Ghana, he moved to Central Asia in 2007, and played three seasons in Kyrgyzstan for Dordoi Bishkek.

Club career
The Ghanaian born Ari started his career in Dordoi Bishkek where he played three seasons and acquired Kyrgyzstani citizenship. He then spent one season with Vakhsh Qughonteppa in neighboring Tajikistan. He then played for Bowsher Club, in Oman.

On 31 March 2020, Ari was announced as part of Dushanbe-83's squad for the 2020 season. Ari left Dushanbe-83 during the 2020 season's summer transfer window, having not played for the club.

International career
Ari has eight national appearances for Kyrgyzstan to his name.

Career statistics

International

Statistics accurate as of match played 19 May 2014

References

External links
 
 
 

1987 births
Living people
Ghanaian emigrants to Kyrgyzstan
Ghanaian footballers
Kyrgyzstani footballers
Kyrgyzstani expatriate footballers
Kyrgyzstan international footballers
FC Dordoi Bishkek players
Vakhsh Qurghonteppa players
Regar-TadAZ Tursunzoda players
Bowsher Club players
Oman Professional League players
Association football defenders
Expatriate footballers in Tajikistan
Expatriate footballers in Kyrgyzstan
Expatriate footballers in Oman
Tajikistan Higher League players